Otoque is an island located in the Gulf of Panama. It belongs to the Taboga District. It has an area of 2.66 km². At the census 2000, the population was 130. The island was originally inhabited by indigenous groups led by chiefs Careta, Tatalao and Estivá, which fought against the Spanish conquerors. Currently, the population of the island consists of a racial mixture. This population is divided into two groups located at opposite places of the island: the districts of East Otoque and West Otoque. The economy of this island is based mainly on fishing and subsistence agriculture.

References 

Pacific islands of Panama
Gulf of Panama
Panamá Province